One-key MAC (OMAC) is a message authentication code constructed from a block cipher much like the CBC-MAC algorithm.

Officially there are two OMAC algorithms (OMAC1 and OMAC2) which are both essentially the same except for a small tweak. OMAC1 is equivalent to CMAC, which became an NIST recommendation in May 2005.

It is free for all uses: it is not covered by any patents.
In cryptography, CMAC is a block cipher-based message authentication code algorithm. It may be used to provide assurance of the authenticity and, hence, the integrity of data. This mode of operation fixes security deficiencies of CBC-MAC (CBC-MAC is secure only for fixed-length messages).

The core of the CMAC algorithm is a variation of CBC-MAC that Black and Rogaway proposed and analyzed under the name XCBC and submitted to NIST. The XCBC algorithm efficiently addresses the security deficiencies of CBC-MAC, but requires three keys. Iwata and Kurosawa proposed an improvement of XCBC and named the resulting algorithm One-Key CBC-MAC (OMAC) in their papers. They later submitted OMAC1, a refinement of OMAC, and additional security analysis. The OMAC algorithm reduces the amount of key material required for XCBC. CMAC is equivalent to OMAC1.

To generate an ℓ-bit CMAC tag (t) of a message (m) using a b-bit block cipher (E) and a secret key (k), one first generates two b-bit sub-keys (k1 and k2) using the following algorithm (this is equivalent to multiplication by x and x2 in a finite field GF(2b)). Let ≪ denote the standard left-shift operator and ⊕ denote bit-wise exclusive or:

 Calculate a temporary value k0 = Ek(0).
 If msb(k0) = 0, then k1 = k0 ≪ 1, else k1 = (k0 ≪ 1) ⊕ C; where C is a certain constant that depends only on b. (Specifically, C is the non-leading coefficients of the lexicographically first irreducible degree-b binary polynomial with the minimal number of ones: 0x1B for 64-bit, 0x87 for 128-bit, and 0x425 for 256-bit blocks.)
 If , then , else .
 Return keys (k1, k2) for the MAC generation process.

The CMAC tag generation process is as follows:
 Divide message into b-bit blocks , where m1, ..., mn−1 are complete blocks. (The empty message is treated as one incomplete block.)
 If mn is a complete block then  else .
 Let .
 For , calculate .
 
 Output .

The verification process is as follows:
 Use the above algorithm to generate the tag.
 Check that the generated tag is equal to the received tag.

Implementations
 Python implementation: see the usage of the AES_CMAC() function in "impacket/blob/master/tests/misc/test_crypto.py", and its definition in "impacket/blob/master/impacket/crypto.py"
 Ruby implementation

References

External links
  The AES-CMAC Algorithm
  The AES-CMAC-96 Algorithm and Its Use with IPsec
  The Advanced Encryption Standard-Cipher-based Message Authentication Code-Pseudo-Random Function-128 (AES-CMAC-PRF-128)
 OMAC Online Test
 More information on OMAC
 Rust implementation

Message authentication codes
Finite fields